
Gmina Bobrowo (German: Bobrau) is a rural gmina (administrative district) in Brodnica County, Kuyavian-Pomeranian Voivodeship, in north-central Poland.

Villages
Gmina Bobrowo contains the villages and settlements of Anielewo, Bobrowo, Bobrowo-Kolonia, Bogumiłki, Brudzawy, Buczek, Budy, Chojno, Czartówiec, Czekanowo, Dąbrówka, Drużyny, Florencja, Foluszek, Grabówiec, Grzybno, Kawki, Kruszyny, Kruszyny Szlacheckie, Kruszyny-Rumunki, Lisa Młyn, Małki, Nieżywięć, Pasieki, Słoszewy, Smolniki, Tylice, Wądzyn, Wichulec, Wymokłe, Zarośle and Zgniłobłoty.

Neighbouring gminas
Gmina Bobrowo is bordered by the town of Brodnica and by the gminas of Brodnica, Dębowa Łąka, Golub-Dobrzyń, Jabłonowo Pomorskie, Książki, Wąpielsk and Zbiczno.

References
 Polish official population figures 2006

Bobrowo
Brodnica County